St. Christopher's School is an American private college preparatory school for boys located in Richmond, Virginia. The school is listed on the National Register of Historic Places.

History
Dr. Churchill Gibson Chamberlayne founded St. Christopher's School in 1911 as The Chamberlayne School. On June 11, 1920, a system of church schools was established by the Episcopal Diocese of Virginia, at which time The Chamberlayne School was renamed St. Christopher's School.

The campus includes frame buildings from the era of its founding as well as brick buildings added in the second–quarter of the 20th–century. The campus became a Virginia Landmark on December 5, 2001, and was listed on the National Register of Historic Places on March 13, 2002.

Students 
As of 2022, the student population is 938. The students are all male and are 63% White, 11% Asian, 9% African American, 8% Hispanic, 6% Multiracial, and 0% Native American and Pacific Island.

The student to teacher ratio is 9 to 1.

Academics 
St. Christopher's includes junior kindergarten through 12th grade. It offers more than 25 Advanced Placement courses. A program of coordination with nearby St. Catherine's School allows a broader selection of courses at the Upper School level, taught in coeducational classes on both campuses. After graduating, 100% of its students attend a four–year college.

Niche ranks the school as the number two all-boys high school and the number 8 K through grade twelve school in Virginia.

Student life

Athletics 
St. Christopher's School belongs to two athletic associations, the Virginia Prep League and the Virginia Independent Schools Athletic Association (VISAA). St. Christopher's has longstanding athletic rivalries with Benedictine High School, Collegiate School, and Woodberry Forest School.

The wrestling program, considered one of the best in Virginia, held a streak of thirteen consecutive Prep League and state VISAA championships.

Student publications 
 The Pine Needle Online (web-based newspaper)
Raps and Taps (yearbook)
 Hieroglyphic (arts journal)
 Paperboy (middle school online publication)

Accreditations and memberships 
St. Christopher's School is accredited or a member of the following organizations:
 National Association of Independent Schools (NAIS)
 Virginia Association of Independent Schools (VAIS)
International Boys' Schools Coalition (IBSC)

Notable alumni
 Edmund Archer (1904–1986), artist
 Penn Badgley (born 1986), actor in television series Gossip Girl
 Mason Bates (born 1977), composer
 Brent Bookwalter (born 1984), professional cyclist, Tour de France contender in 2010
 Harry Easterly (1922–2005), President of the United States Golf Association
 Gregory Grey Garland Jr. (1924–2020), lawyer, business executive, chairman Pittsburgh and Lake Erie Railroad
 Henry Hager (born 1934), a politician
 Will Hardy (born 1988), professional basketball coach and current head coach of the Utah Jazz
 Dean H. King (born 1962), novelist
 G. Manoli Loupassi (born 1967), politician, a former member of the Virginia House of Delegates
 Don Mancini (born 1963), filmmaker, producer, and director
 A. Donald McEachin (born 1961-2022), politician, member of the United States House of Representatives
 Chris Peace (born 1976), former member of the Virginia House of Delegates 
 Robert Pratt (born 1951), professional football player
 Ted Price, CEO of Insomniac Games
 Harrison Ruffin Tyler (born 1928), American chemical engineer, businessperson, and preservationist
 Stephan Said (born 1968), musician and activist
 Tom Slater (born 1968), baseball coach
 James Harvie Wilkinson III (born 1944), a federal judge serving on the United States Court of Appeals for the Fourth Circuit
 Monk Willis (1916–2011), LBJ political adviser, regent for the University of North Texas
 Martin Williams (1924–1992), jazz critic
 Tom Wolfe (1931–2018), novelist

References

External links

School buildings on the National Register of Historic Places in Virginia
Schools in Richmond, Virginia
High schools in Richmond, Virginia
Educational institutions established in 1911
Episcopal schools in Virginia
Private high schools in Virginia
Private middle schools in Virginia
Private elementary schools in Virginia
National Register of Historic Places in Richmond, Virginia
1911 establishments in Virginia
St. Christopher's School (Richmond, Virginia) alumni